Orestes (died 28 August 476) was a Roman general and politician of Pannonian ancestry, who held considerable influence in the late Western Roman Empire.

Biography
Born to a Roman aristocratic family from Pannonia Savia, Orestes was son of Tatulus, a pagan, and son-in-law to Romulus, who served as comes in the Western Roman Empire. After Pannonia was ceded to Attila the Hun, Orestes joined Attila's court, reaching high position as a secretary (notarius) in 449 and 452. In 449 Attila sent him twice to Constantinople with ambassador Eslas.

In 475, Orestes was appointed magister militum and patricius by Western Roman Emperor Julius Nepos. This proved to be a mistake on the part of Nepos. By 28 August 475, Orestes, at the head of the foederati levies, managed to take control of the government in Ravenna, which had been the de facto capital of the Western Roman Empire since 402. Julius Nepos fled without a fight to Dalmatia, where he would continue to reign until his assassination in 480. With the emperor far away, Orestes elevated his son Romulus to the rank of Augustus, so that the last Western Roman emperor is known as Romulus Augustulus meaning "little Augustus" as the emperor was only a child, somewhere between 12 and 15 years old, at the time he became emperor in 475.

In popular culture
Orestes was played by Andrew Pleavin in the 2001 miniseries Attila, which depicts his time in service of the Hunnic king.
The character of Orestes was played by Iain Glen in the 2007 historical-fiction film The Last Legion, which shows the character during his period of rule in Rome, although the film deviates significantly from the historical record of these events.
 Orestes is portrayed as the primary villain in Michael Curtis Ford's novel The Fall of Rome.

See also
Roman usurper
List of Roman usurpers

References

External links
 Gibbon, Decline and Fall of the Roman Empire part v, chapter xxxvi

Year of birth unknown
476 deaths
Ancient Roman politicians
Magistri militum
5th-century Romans
Romans from Pannonia
Romulus Augustulus